Amnicola dalli, common name the peninsula amnicola, is a species of freshwater snail with an operculum, an aquatic gastropod mollusk in the family Amnicolidae.

The specific epithet is in honor of W. H. Dall.

Subspecies 
 Amnicola dalli johnsoni (Pilsbry, 1899) North Peninsula Amnicola - image

Shell description 
The shell is narrowly umbilicate, obtusely conical, shining, slightly striated and brown or greenish horn in color. The shell has 4 convex whorls that are gradually increasing in size. Suture is regularly impressed, somewhat deep.

The aperture is rounded before, somewhat angular behind  and bluish white within. The lip is simple, sharp, margins joined by a thick callus. The columella is rather reflexed.

The width of the shell is 2.30 mm. The height of the shell is 3.50 mm.

Anatomy 

The jaw is thin and membranaceous.

The formula off the radula is: 34-23-7-  -7-23-34.

Distribution 
The type locality is mountain streams which are tributary to Pyramid Lake in northwestern Nevada.

References
This article incorporates public domain text from reference.

Amnicola
Gastropods described in 1884